Griffins Landing is an unincorporated community in Lancaster County in the U. S. state of Virginia.

References

Unincorporated communities in Virginia
Unincorporated communities in Lancaster County, Virginia